Halvard Storm (August 10, 1877 - May 7, 1964) was a 20th-century Norwegian artist.

Biography 
Storm was born in Kristiania (Oslo) to professor Johan Storm and Louise Bruun and was christened on September 2, 1877.  He immigrated to the United States in 1901 and lived in the vibrant Norwegian-American enclave of Bay Ridge, Brooklyn, New York.   He married Martha Louise Trilseth (born May 29, 1877, Eidsvoll, Norway) on February 10, 1906, at Our Savior's Lutheran Church in Brooklyn.  Storm registered for the US World War I draft in September 1918 as all eligible men were required to register regardless of citizenship.  In the 1920s, he returned to Norway to live, but he traveled to the United States many times during subsequent decades. Storm's wife died on August 28, 1941, and he later married Sigrid Roscher (1888-1964).   Storm died on May 7, 1964, and is buried alongside his parents, three brothers, and both wives in Oslo's Vestre Gravlund.

Artist 
Storm is most well known for his etchings of Norwegian landscapes, towns, and architecture.  He also etched portraits and illustrated books.  Two of his pieces, "Sam’s Point, Cragsmoor" and "Cragsmoor," were exhibited at the 1920 Society of Independent Artists in New York.  In the 1940s, Storm's art was shown in New York and Minneapolis, as well in Australia. He is listed in Who was Who in American Art, 1540–1975.  He signed his name, along with the year, on the bottom right corner of his pieces.  Today, Storm's work can be found in auctions in Norway and the United States and is sought-after for its authentic depiction of traditional Norwegian scenes from the last century.

References 

20th-century Norwegian artists
1877 births
1964 deaths
Artists from Brooklyn